James Keane (born September 26, 1952) is an American film and television actor. He is known for playing the role of Willis Thomas Bell in the American drama television series The Paper Chase.

Life and career 
Keane was born in Buffalo, New York. He graduated from the American Academy of Dramatic Arts, and began his career in 1975, appearing in the film Three Days of the Condor playing a store clerk. Between acting jobs he was an elevator operator at the Sherry-Netherland hotel in New York, where he met film director, Francis Ford Coppola. Keane thought that he might get a role in The Godfather Part II until he realised that shooting was to be in Sicily. 

In 1978 Keane joined the cast of the new CBS drama television series The Paper Chase as the law student Willis Thomas Bell. He also appeared in the 1979 film Apocalypse Now, and was hired to overdub some of Marlon Brando’s lines in the television miniseries of The Godfather. Keane appeared in the 1982 film 48 Hrs. (as Detective Van Zant, and the 1990 film Dick Tracy as Dick Tracy's second-in-command Pat Patton.

References

External links 

Rotten Tomatoes profile

1952 births
Living people
People from Buffalo, New York
Male actors from New York (state)
American male film actors
American male television actors
American male voice actors
20th-century American male actors
21st-century American male actors
American Academy of Dramatic Arts alumni
Harvard Law School alumni